Smerinthulus designata is a species of moth of the  family Sphingidae. It is known from China.

References

Smerinthulus
Moths described in 1928